The Battery "D" 1st Michigan Light Artillery Regiment was an artillery battery that served in the Union Army during the American Civil War.

Service 
Battery "D"  was organized at Coldwater, Michigan  between  September 17, 1861 and December 9, 1862.

Battery was engaged at: Hoover's Gap, Tn / Chickamauga, Ga / Chattanooga, Tn / Mission Ridge, Tn/ Nashville, Tn

The battery was mustered out on August 3, 1865.

Total strength and casualties
The battery lost 2 enlisted men killed in action or mortally wounded and 39 enlisted men who died of disease, for a total of 41 fatalities.

Total Enrollment—334..... Killed in Action—1..... Died of Wounds—1..... Died of Disease—39

Total Casualty Rate—11.9%

Commanders 
Captain Alonzo F. Bidwell
Captain Josiah W. Church (Captain Bidwell having resigned on August 2, 1862.)
Captain H.B. Corbin  (Captain  H.B. Corbin  (Captain Church having been promoted to Major in the regiment on March 3, 1864)
Captain Jesse Fuller (July 15, 1865 until they were mustered out in Jackson, Michigan on August 3, 1865)
Captain Jack Wander  (Captain  Jack Wander  (Captain Wander having been promoted to Major in the regiment on March 3, 1864)

See also 
 List of Michigan Civil War Units
 Michigan in the American Civil War

Notes

References 
 The Civil War Archive

Artillery
1865 disestablishments in Michigan
Artillery units and formations of the American Civil War
1861 establishments in Michigan
Military units and formations established in 1861
Military units and formations disestablished in 1865